Swayambhu (Devanagari: स्वयम्भू स्तूप; Nepal bhasa: स्वयंभू; sometimes Swayambu or Swoyambhu) is an ancient religious complex atop a hill in the Kathmandu Valley, west of Kathmandu city. The Tibetan name for the site means 'Sublime Trees' (Wylie: Phags.pa Shing.kun), for the many varieties of trees found on the hill. For the Buddhist Newars, in whose mythological history and origin myth as well as day-to-day religious practice Swayambhu occupies a central position, it is probably the most sacred among Buddhist pilgrimage sites. For Tibetans and followers of Tibetan Buddhism, it is second only to Boudha. Swayambhu is the Hindu name.

The complex consists of a stupa, a variety of shrines and temples, some dating back to the Licchavi period. A Tibetan monastery, museum and library are more recent additions. The stupa has Buddha's eyes and eyebrows painted on. Between them, the number one (in Nepal script) is painted in the fashion of a nose. There are also shops, restaurants and hostels. The site has two access points: a long staircase leading directly to the main platform of the temple, which is from the top of the hill to the east; and a car road around the hill from the south leading to the south-west entrance. The first sight on reaching the top of the stairway is the Vajra. Tsultrim Allione describes the experience:We were breathless and sweating as we stumbled up the last steep steps and practically fell upon the biggest vajra (thunderbolt scepter) that I have ever seen. Behind this Vajra was the vast, round, white dome of the stupa, like a full solid skirt, at the top of which were two giant Buddha eyes wisely looking out over the peaceful valley which was just beginning to come alive.

Much of Swayambhu's iconography comes from the Vajrayana tradition of Newar Buddhism. However, the complex is an important site for Buddhists of many schools, and is also revered by Hindus.

Mythology
According to Swayambhu Purana, the entire valley was once filled with an enormous lake, out of which grew a lotus. The valley came to be known as Swayambhu, meaning "Self-Created." The name comes from an eternal self-existent flame over which a sūpa was later built.

There are holy monkeys living in the north-west parts of the temple. They are holy because Manjushri, the bodhisattva of wisdom and learning, was raising the hill which the stupa stands on. He was supposed to leave his hair short, but he made it grow long and head lice grew. It is said that the head lice transformed into these monkeys.

Manjusri had a vision of the Lotus at Swayambhu and traveled there to worship it. Seeing that the valley could be a good settlement, and to make the site more accessible to human pilgrims, he cut a gorge at Chovar. The water drained out of the lake, leaving the valley in which Kathmandu now lies. The Lotus was transformed into a hill and the flower became the stupa.

History
Swayambhu is among the oldest religious sites in Nepal. This seems to be confirmed by a damaged stone inscription found at the site, which indicates that King Vrsadeva ordered work done in 640 CE.

However, Emperor Ashoka is said to have visited the site in the third century BCE and built a temple on the hill which was later destroyed.

Although the site is considered Buddhist, the place is revered by both Buddhists and Hindus. Numerous Hindu monarch followers are known to have paid their homage to the temple, including Pratap Malla, the powerful king of Kathmandu, who is responsible for the construction of the eastern stairway in the seventeenth century.

The stupa was completely renovated in May 2010, its first major renovation since 1921 and its 15th in the nearly 1,500 years since it was built. The Swayambhu Shrine was re-gilded using 20 kg of gold. The renovation was funded by the Tibetan Nyingma Meditation Center of California, and began in June 2008.

At around 5 a.m. on 14 February 2011, Pratapur Temple in the Swayambhu Monument Zone suffered damage from a lightning strike during a sudden thunderstorm.

The Swayambunath complex suffered damage in the April 2015 Nepal earthquake.

Architecture

The stupa consists of a dome at the base, on top of which is a cube structure, painted with eyes of Buddha looking in all four directions. There are pentagonal toranas present above each of the four sides of the cube with Buddha reliefs on them. Behind and above the toranas there are thirteen tiers. Above all the tiers there is a small space above which the Gajur is present.

There are five gilt Buddha shrines at the base of the stupa, all with a Buddha statue inside them. Equally five Tara shrines can be found here, but only four of them are gilt and actually house a Tara statue. The shrine of Vajradhatishori Tara, or White Tara, is empty.

Symbolism
The dome at the base represents the entire world. When a person awakes (represented by eyes of wisdom and compassion) from the bonds of the world, the person reaches the state of enlightenment. The thirteen pinnacles on the top symbolize that sentient beings have to go through the thirteen stages of spiritual realizations to reach enlightenment or Buddhahood.

There is a large pair of eyes on each of the four sides of the main stupa which represent Wisdom and Compassion, known as the Eyes of Buddha. Above each pair of eyes is another eye, the third eye. It is said that when Buddha preaches, cosmic rays emanate from the third eye which acts as messages to heavenly beings so that those interested can come down to earth to listen to the Buddha. The hellish beings and beings below the human realm cannot come to earth to listen to the Buddha's teaching, however, the cosmic rays relieve their suffering when Buddha preaches. Between the two eyes (also called Wisdom Eyes), a curly symbol, symbolizing the nose, is depicted which looks like a question mark, which is a Nepali sign of number figure one. This sign represents the unity of all things existing in the world as well as the only path to enlightenment through the teachings of Buddha.

There are carvings of the Panch Buddhas (five Buddhas) on each of the four sides of top of the stupa, just like there are statues of the Buddhas at the base of the stupa. Panch Buddhas are Buddha in a metaphorical sense in Tantrayana. They are Vairochana (occupies the center and is the master of the temple), Akshobhya (faces the east and represents the cosmic element of consciousness), Ratna Sambhava (faces the south and represents the cosmic element of sensation), Amitabha (He represents the cosmic element of Sanjna (name) and always faces the West) and Amoghsiddhi (He represents the cosmic element of confirmation and faces the north).

Each morning before dawn hundreds of Buddhist (Vajrayana) and Hindu pilgrims ascend the steps from the eastern side that lead up the hill, passing the gilded Vajra (Tibetan: Dorje) and two lions guarding the entrance, and begin a series of clockwise circumambulations of the stupa.

Swayambhu Purana
Swayambhu Purana (Devnagari: स्वयम्भू पूराण) is a Buddhist scripture about the origin and development of Kathmandu valley. Swayambhu Purana gives detail of all the Buddhas who came to Kathmandu. It also provides information about the first and the second Buddhas in Buddhism.

Gallery

See also
Newar Buddhism
Dharma Man Tuladhar
Buddhist pilgrimage sites in Nepal
List of Mahaviharas of Newar Buddhism
List of monasteries in Nepal
List of Stupas in Nepal
Natural History Museum of Nepal
Pashupatinath Temple
Shamarpa

Footnotes

Additional references
Swoyambu Historical Pictorial. Edited by Richard Josephon. (1985). Satya Ho. Kathmandu.
Psycho-cosmic Symbolism of the Buddhist Stūpa. Lama Anagarika Govinda. (1976) Dharma Books. Berkeley, California. ;  (pbk).

Further reading
Ehrhard, Franz-Karl (1989). "A Renovation of Svayambhunath-Stupa in the 18th Century and its History (according to Tibetan sources)." Ancient Nepal – Journal of the Department of Archaeology, Number 114, October–November 1989, pp. 1–8.
von Schroeder, Ulrich. 2019. Nepalese Stone Sculptures. Volume One: Hindu; Volume Two: Buddhist. (Visual Dharma Publications). . SD card with 15,000 digital photographs of Nepalese sculptures and other subjects as public domain.

Newar
Nepalese culture
Stupas in Nepal
Buddhist pilgrimage sites in Nepal
Tibetan Buddhist places
World Heritage Sites in Nepal
Religious buildings and structures completed in 1989
5th-century Buddhist temples
Newa Heritages
Mañjuśrī
5th-century establishments in Nepal